Alamedilla is a city located in the province of Granada, Spain. According to the 2005 census (INE), the city has a population of 811 inhabitants.

References

External links 
 Alamedilla - Sistema de Información Multiterritorial de Andalucía
 Alamedilla gallery at WikiCommons

Municipalities in the Province of Granada